Douglas Gilbert Lamb (born 22 May 1968) is a Belizean former cyclist. He competed in two events at the 1992 Summer Olympics.

References

External links
 

1968 births
Living people
Belizean male cyclists
Olympic cyclists of Belize
Cyclists at the 1992 Summer Olympics
Place of birth missing (living people)